Cool Dudes were an Australian jazz band from the Hunter Valley in the late 1980s. Their self titled album was nominated for the 1989 ARIA Award for Best Jazz Album. The group split by the mid-1990s. Terry Widowson was a member of the Neville Ure Trio in mid-1999 with Andrew Wallace on double bass and Cary Bennett on drums.

The Cool Dudes re-united in early 2001 for a limited number of shows in that year with the four-piece line-up of Trevor Furner on reeds, Greg Henshaw on vocals and bass guitar, Terry Widowson on keyboards and Peter Young on drums. According to Newcastle's The Posts reporter, "the quartet performs mainstream interpretations of jazz standards... [they] press ahead with a low-key comeback."

Members

Trevor Furner – saxophone
Terry Widowson – keyboards
Howard Ward – bass guitar, vocals
Peter Young – drums
Milton Saunders – keyboards
Paul Watters – guitar
Greg Henshaw – bass guitar, vocals
Giles Smith – bass guitar

Discography

Albums

Awards and nominations

ARIA Music Awards
The ARIA Music Awards is an annual awards ceremony that recognises excellence, innovation, and achievement across all genres of Australian music. They commenced in 1987. 

! 
|-
| 1989
| Cool Dudes
| Best Jazz Album
| 
| 
|-

References

Australian jazz ensembles